Hillman Foundation may refer to:
 The Benji Hillman Foundation, an Israeli foundation that helps soldiers
 Elsie H. Hillman Foundation of the Hillman Family Foundations, 18 named foundations
 The Sidney Hillman Foundation, awards prizes to journalists